The Ravenswood City School District is a public school district headquartered in East Palo Alto, California, US.  The district, in the San Francisco Bay Area, serves the communities of East Palo Alto and eastern Menlo Park.  Students from this school district who continue on with public schooling matriculate to the Sequoia Union High School District. In 2008-09 it served over 4,500 students.
In 2019-20 student enrollment declined to approximately 3,200 with further enrollment declines projected. In the 2021-22 school year, student enrollment is reported as approximately 2,800.

Schools

Elementary schools
 Belle Haven Elementary (TK, Kindergarten - 5th)
 Costaño School of the Arts (TK, Kindergarten - 5th)
 Los Robles-Ronald McNair Academy (TK, Kindergarten - 5th)

Middle school
 Cesar Chavez Ravenswood Middle School (6th - 8th)

References

External links

 
 East Palo Alto Kids Foundation
 Ravenswood Education Foundation
 Ravenswood High School Alumni Network Website

School districts in San Mateo County, California